Dejan Petrovič (born 12 January 1998) is a Slovenian footballer who plays for Rapid Wien as a midfielder.

Club career
Petrovič made his professional debut in the Slovenian PrvaLiga for Aluminij on 23 July 2016 in a game against Koper.

International career
Petrovič made his national team debut on 7 October 2020 in a friendly against San Marino.

Personal life
Petrovič hails from a small settlement of Rače, a few kilometers south of Maribor. His family name Petrovič has erroneously been, particularly in Austria, misspelled as Petrović.

Career statistics

Club

Notes

References

External links
 NZS profile 
 

1998 births
Living people
Slovenian footballers
Association football midfielders
Slovenia youth international footballers
Slovenia under-21 international footballers
Slovenia international footballers
NK Aluminij players
SK Rapid Wien players
Slovenian Second League players
Slovenian PrvaLiga players
Austrian Football Bundesliga players
2. Liga (Austria) players
Slovenian expatriate footballers
Slovenian expatriate sportspeople in Austria
Expatriate footballers in Austria